Ulla-Maj Wideroos (born 22 October 1951 in Jakobstad, Finland) is a Finnish politician and former minister who belongs to the Swedish People's Party. She has an education in economy and trade. Wideroos served as the second Minister of Finance in Matti Vanhanen's first cabinet from 27 April 2003 to 18 April 2007.

She is chairperson of the Swedish Assembly of Finland since April 2007.

Wideroos began her political career in Svensk Ungdom and became the municipal director for Oravais in 1986. She was elected to the government in 1995 and subsequently left the municipal director post.

Wideroos lives in Närpes. She is married and has a son.

References

External links
Profile and CV from Parliament of Finland

1951 births
Living people
People from Jakobstad
Swedish-speaking Finns
Swedish People's Party of Finland politicians
Ministers of Finance of Finland
Members of the Parliament of Finland (1995–99)
Members of the Parliament of Finland (1999–2003)
Members of the Parliament of Finland (2003–07)
Members of the Parliament of Finland (2007–11)
Members of the Parliament of Finland (2011–15)
Women government ministers of Finland
21st-century Finnish women politicians